The Bergamo Lions are an American football team from Bergamo, Italy established in 1983 and playing in the Italian Football League. They won the Eurobowl in 2000, 2001 and 2002, while losing to the Vienna Vikings in the finals of 2004 and 2005 Eurobowl. 
In Italy, the Lions have won the Italian league championship more than any other team 12 times. The Lions last Italian Championship was won in the 2008 season.

The Lions sign and pay American and Canadian professional import players to play for the team alongside Italian players and European import teammates.  A few examples are former New England Patriots running back Scott Lockwood who played for the Lions 1994-1996, Kansas City Chiefs and Toronto Argonauts wide receiver Jeris McIntyre and running back Tyrone Rush 1998-2004.  
The Lions have also recruited and signed many American coaches, including Adam Rita as head coach and Brian Baldinger as their offensive line coach.

Championships 
 12  Italiano (Italian championship): 1993, 1998, 1999, 2000, 2001, 2002, 2003, 2004, 2005, 2006, 2007, 2008.
 3 Eurobowl (European championship): 2000, 2001, 2002.
 1 Champions League: 2000.

References

External links
 Baldi in Bergamo, Italy Blog

American football teams in Italy
Sport in Bergamo
1983 establishments in Italy
American football teams established in 1983